Clyde B. Phillips (born October 3, 1958) is a film producer, television writer, television producer, and novelist.

Career
For the 1970s, Phillips worked at Bob Banner Associates, before starting Blue Hill Avenue Productions with a contract at 20th Century-Fox Television. In 1985, he worked on an unsold television pilot Northstar with friend Daniel Grodnik. In 1986, he started working at a job at Columbia Pictures Television to produce their own projects.

Phillips joined the crew of the television drama Dexter as a showrunner, executive producer and writer for the first season. He joined the crew after the pilot was already finished and he ended up reshooting some of the scenes and scrapping others. He was nominated for the Edgar Award for Best Television Episode (Teleplay), for writing the episode "Crocodile". He returned as the showrunner, executive producer and writer for the next three seasons. Phillips and the writing staff were nominated for a Writers Guild of America Award for Best Dramatic Series at the 2008 ceremony for their work on the second season. The writing staff were nominated for the same award at the 2009 ceremony for their work on the third season. Phillips and the writing staff was nominated for the WGA award a third consecutive time at the 2010 ceremony for their work on the fourth season. Phillips stepped down as showrunner after the fourth season. Dexter was nominated for 18 Emmy Awards under his leadership, including three nominations for Outstanding Drama Series.

Phillips joined Nurse Jackie for the fifth season, where he served as showrunner and executive producer for its final three seasons.

In 2016, he adapted the Danish series Bankerot into the series Feed the Beast. The series was canceled after one season.

In 2020, it was announced that Phillips would return as showrunner for a 10-episode Dexter revival, titled Dexter: New Blood, that premiered on November 7, 2021.

References

External links

1958 births
Living people
People from Dorchester, Massachusetts
Writers from Massachusetts
Novelists from Massachusetts
Screenwriters from Massachusetts
Television producers from Massachusetts
American television producers
American male screenwriters
American male television writers
20th-century American male writers
21st-century American male writers
20th-century American novelists
21st-century American novelists
20th-century American screenwriters
21st-century American screenwriters